Tame Impala [H.I.T.S 003] is the debut extended play by Australian musical project Tame Impala, released on September 2008, through the label, Hole in the Sky. It is the first official release by the band, and only a small number of copies were printed – it is currently out of print. The label was established in 2007 by Perth disco pop duo and producers Canyons.

The six-track EP has the first three tracks repeated by remixes: two by Canyons' members, Ryan "Sea-Mist" Grieve and Leo "Holiday" Thompson, and the third by Fred Cherry. Two tracks, "Half Full Glass of Wine" and "Skeleton Tiger", were released on the band's next EP, Tame Impala, in the following month, with slightly different mixes. This release includes "The Sun", which is not available on future releases – it is one of the oldest songs written by the band's multi-instrumentalist and producer, Kevin Parker.

Parker later reflected on working with the Canyons duo, "They used to run a label which Tame Impala used to sort of be on. We released a 12" vinyl with them once, on one side it had three Tame Impala songs and on the other it was the same three songs remixed by Canyons and that was really cool, it was a really casual relationship."

Track listing

Personnel 

 Kevin Parker – vocals and instrumentation on all tracks, except for:
 Jay Watson – drums and backing vocals on "The Sun"
 Dominic Simper – bass guitar on "The Sun"

References 

Psychedelic rock EPs
Tame Impala EPs
2008 debut EPs
Albums produced by Kevin Parker